Mishrilal Gangwal (Hindi: मिश्रीलाल गंगवाल) was an Indian politician from the state of Madhya Pradesh.He was the member of Indian National Congress party.

Mishrilal Gangwal was born on 7 October 1902 Sonkatch in Dewas district, of Madhya Pradesh state to a Jain Businessman.

His interest in social work led him into politics. He joined Indian National Congress.

He was a former chief minister of Madhya Bharat state from 3 March 1952 and resigned from the post on 15 April 1955.

On November 1956 he became Minister of Finance in the state of Madhya Pradesh. In the year 1959 he served as Minister for Finance, Separate Revenue, Economics & Statistics, and also served as Minister for Food & civil Supplies and had been Minister for several portfolios in later years in Madhya Pradesh government.

He was a member of the All India Congress Committee and the President of Ajmer-Marwara, Provincial Congress Committee. Shri Gangwal was also associated with Indore Rajya Prajamandal and many social and commercial bodies.

He have a son Narendra Gangwal, who lives in Tilak Nagar, Indore and is a retired Assistant Commissioner (RTI) N.V.D.A. M.P. Govt. in 2008, who kept himself outside the politics, and started   Desh bhakti Jagran Abhiyan.

Early life 

MishriLal Gangwal was the eldest son of Balchand Gangwal a Jain businessman from Indore.
In the age of 14 he became the Chairman of his school's (Shri Trilok Chandra Jain Higher Secondary School Indore) student Committee. In the year 1945 he was elected as the President of Indore Rajya Prajamandal adhiveshan.

References

1902 births
1981 deaths
Politicians from Indore
People from Dewas
People from Dewas district
Madhya Bharat politicians
Madhya Pradesh MLAs 1952–1957
Madhya Pradesh MLAs 1957–1962
Chief ministers from Indian National Congress
Indian National Congress politicians from Madhya Pradesh